Lisa Gaye is an American actress more known for her role in The Toxic Avenger saga.

Biography 
Lisa Gaye was born in Baltimore, Maryland and moved to New York City when she was eighteen years old and she still resides there. Gaye starred in many Troma Entertainment motion pictures.

Shortly after Gaye's arrival in NYC, she was accepted into renowned acting coach Lee Strasberg's Master Class.  She studied with him for a few years, being in the last class he taught the day he died.  After that, Gaye went to Los Angeles to study at the Beverly Hills Playhouse where she won a scholarship.  While in LA, Lisa opened the NOWORDS Studio in the penthouse of downtown's skid row Alexandria Hotel.  At NOWORDS she ran a successful art gallery, had poetry readings, produced and acted in avant garde short films, ran still photography shoots and provided a space where artistic creativity flourished.

Upon her return to NYC, Gaye auditioned and won the role of lead villainess Ms. Malfaire in Troma's “Toxic Avenger II” and “Toxic Avenger III: The Last Temptation of Toxie”.  Immediately a fan favorite, Gaye returned to Troma to play the lead Professor Holt, with her 3 ft. high beehive, in “Class of Nuke’Em High Part II: Subhumanoid Meltdown” and “Class of Nuke’Em High Part III: The Good, The Bad and The Subhumanoid".  It is this role that won her a “Best In B Award” for the USA Network.  She continued to work with Troma throughout her career on many of their projects and in their movies.

During this period of time, Gaye was well known on the nightlife circuit of NYC and had many successful parties at the top clubs: Danceteria, Tunnel, Limelight, Life, among others and was frequently in the NY Post's PAGE SIX.

Gaye's interest in the arts brought her the opportunity to be the American curator of a video project "Xenographia" for the 45th Venice Biennalle.  She was featured in Brooke Hunyady's "A Portrait Of Peter Beard" film for that video installation which continues to be shown worldwide.

Gaye worked with many famous photographers and can be found in Gordon Park's book “A Star For Noon”.

Filmography
The Toxic Avenger Part II - Ms. Malfaire
The Toxic Avenger Part III: The Last Temptation of Toxie - Ms. Malfaire
Citizen Toxie: The Toxic Avenger IV - Abortion Counselor
Class of Nuke 'Em High 2: Subhumanoid Meltdown - Professor Holt
Class of Nuke 'Em High 3: The Good, the Bad and the Subhumanoid - Professor Holt
Terror Firmer - Casey's Mom
Sgt. Kabukiman N.Y.P.D. - Stuart's Evil Women
State of Mind - Ruth/Janis
Bikini Beach Race - Leanne

References
	
Femme Fatales Magazine: Vol.11 #2
https://web.archive.org/web/20120424230436/http://www.madmags.de/en/archive/details/Magazines/femme-fatales/vol-11-2
http://www.lisagaye.com/portfolio/press/femmeFatales.html
Royal House of Monaco:
https://web.archive.org/web/20120424230434/http://www.stephanieparker.com/royal/royal.html
Village Voice:
http://www.villagevoice.com/1999-09-14/nyc-life/two-bedroom-apartment-in-building-with-courtyard/

External links
 
 
 YouTube Channel

Living people
Actresses from New York City
American film actresses
Actresses from Baltimore
20th-century American actresses
21st-century American actresses
Year of birth missing (living people)